Gang Again (styled as gangAGAIN) is the second studio album recorded by Australian band Gang Gajang (styled as GANGgajang). It was released in 1987 by True Tone Records and distributed by Polygram Records.

Track listing 
All songs by Mark Callaghan unless otherwise indicated.
 "Tree of Love"
 "Luck of the Irish"
 "In Spite of Love" (Geoffrey Stapleton)
 "Roof Only Leaks (When It's Raining)" (Graham Bidstrup, Robert James, Callaghan, Kayellen Bidstrup)
 "Initiation" (Callaghan, G Bidstrup)
 "Thanks to Dave" (G Bidstrup, Callaghan)
 "American Money" (Stapleton)
 "Live and Learn"
 "Fire of Genius" (K Bidstrup, G Bidstrup, Stapleton)
 "The Rise and the Rise of the Reverend Bobby's Buskers" 
 "Baby has Eyes for You " (James)

Charts

Personnel

Gang Gajang
Mark Callagan: Guitars, Vocals, "Body Percussion", Spoons
Geoffrey Stapleton: Keyboards, Guitars, Vocals, Harmonica
Robert Nelson James: Guitars, Vocals 
Chris Bailey: Bass
Graham Bidstrup: Drums, Percussion, Guitars, Keyboards

Additional Personnel
Clive Hodson: Alto Sax
Mark Dennison: Alto and Tenor Sax
Peter Lothian: Trumpet
Kevin Dubber: Trombone
Andrew Leach: Piano
Kayellen Bee, Marilyn Delaney, Wendy Matthews: Backing Vocals

References

External links
Ganggajang - Official Website a

1987 albums
Gang Gajang albums